Kvarnby IK is a Swedish football club from the residential area of Kvarnby in Malmö. The club plays in Division 2 Östra Götaland which is the fourth tier of Swedish football.

Background
The club was founded in 1906, making it the second oldest football club in Malmö after IFK Malmö. Since their foundation Kvarnby IK has participated mainly in the lower divisions of the Swedish football league system. The club has experienced a period of glory in the last few years being promoted three times in the last three years, from Division 5 in 2007 to Division 2 in 2010. They play their home matches at the Bäckagårds IP in Malmö.

Kvarnby IK are affiliated to the Skånes Fotbollförbund.

Season to season

Players

Kvarnby IK squad

As of 2018-08-18

Reserve team squad

As of 2011-04-20

Technical staff

As of 2018-04-18

Footnotes

External links
Official site

Sport in Malmö
Football clubs in Malmö
Association football clubs established in 1906
1906 establishments in Sweden